The IED Design Awards consist of an awards gala organized by the Madrid headquarters of the Istituto Europeo di Design since 2016, whose purpose is to honor all those people and projects that stand out within the design world. Encompassing everything ranging from brands, professionals, entrepreneurs and to even groups, the IED presents awards every year to diverse projects and initiatives, raising awareness and promoting them, recognizing their importance and quality, and highlighting the value of design and creativity.

The awards take place on a ceremony that, since 2017, has been held in the Italian Embassy in Madrid. The finalists and winners are chosen by a committee of experts madep up of outstanding professionals from the design world and members of the management team of the different IED schools in Madrid.

The IED Design Awards include over 18 categories, encompassing the fashion world, interior design, digital design, product design, graphic design and process design, among others.

In 2018, the Honorific Award category was added, in order to pay homage to the career of an exceptional professional from the design field. In 2018, the award was granted to the publicist Toni Segarra, who is considered to be the 'best creative of the 20th Century'. At the 2019 edition, the British fashion designer, Katharine Hamnett, was awarded the honor for her outstanding career and her pioneering activism in favor of the sustainability of the fashion industry, which started over 30 years ago.

Awards

2016 
The ceremony took place the 20th of May 2016 at the Aula Magna of IED Madrid, and was hosted by Patricia Conde.

2017 
The ceremony took place on 15 June in the Italian Embassy in Spain, and was hosted by the actress and model Laura Sánchez. The ceremony also featured the presence of the Italian ambassador, Stefano Sannino

2018 

The ceremony, held on 21 June in the gardens of the Italian Embassy in Spain, would once again feature the presence of the Italian Ambassador. The journalist and presenter Sandra Barnerda, was responsible for hosting this ceremony.

2019 

The ceremony was held on 20 June in the gardens of the Italian Embassy in Spain. Sandra Barneda once again hosted the ceremony.

See also

 List of fashion awards

References

Bibliography

External links 

 Official website

Fashion awards
Design awards